Nouhant is a commune in the Creuse department in the Nouvelle-Aquitaine region in central France.

Geography
The commune borders the department of Allier to the east.

Population

Sights
 The church, dating from the twelfth century.
 The remains of a fifteenth-century fortified house at Fressinaud.
 The Château du Clos.
 A fifteenth-century stone cross.

See also
Communes of the Creuse department

References

Communes of Creuse